Unlimited is third studio album by the Norwegian thrash metal band Susperia, released in 2004. Reviews specifically noted them as sounding like Testament.

Track listing

Personnel 
Athera – vocals
Cyrus – lead and rhythm guitar
Elvorn – rhythm guitar
Memnock – bass
Tjodalv – drums

References 

2004 albums
Susperia albums